= Magdalensee =

Small lake east of Villach, Carinthia, Austria

- Location within Austria
- Location: Villach, Carinthia, Austria
- Coordinates: 46°37′3″N 13°53′34″E
- Type: lake
- Surface area: 14 square kilometres (5.4 sq mi)
- Max. depth: 5.2 metres (17 ft)

Magdalensee is a small lake east of the Carinthian city of Villach, Austria. Its surface covers an area of 14 square kilometres (5.4 sq mi), its maximum depth is 5.2 metres (17 ft). The temperature of the body of water can reach up to 79 Fahrenheit (or 26.1 Celsius) and as low as 34 Fahrenheit (or 1.1 Celsius)
